Mount Saint Mary, originally known as Holm, is an inselberg in the north of Ljubljana, the capital of Slovenia. The mountain is part of the city's Šmarna Gora District. It is the highest hill in the city and a popular hiking destination.

The two-peaked mountain resembles the humps of a Bactrian camel or woman's breasts, and it has two peaks: Mount Saint Mary to the east and Grmada to the west.

The toponym contains the archaic contraction Šmarna for Sveta Marijina 'St. Mary's'. The name of the western peak, Grmada, literally means 'heap, pile (of wood for a bonfire)'. The slightly lower eastern peak lends its name to the mountain as a whole.

In clear conditions, the mountain offers a view across much of Slovenia, from Mount Triglav and Mount Stol on the northeastern Austrian–Italian border to Mount Krim, Mount Snežnik, and Trdina Peak on the Croatian border to the southwest. Nearby hills include Bare Hill, Tošč Face, Rožnik, and Rašica.

The hill is surrounded by the villages of Vikrče and Spodnje Pirniče to the west, Zavrh pod Šmarno Goro to the north, and the former villages (now part of Ljubljana) of Šmartno pod Šmarno Goro and Tacen to the southeast.

The southern slope of the mountain is wooded with downy oak and hop hornbeam, while the northern slope is covered by a beech forest.

The bell tower on the top of the mountain rings each day half an hour before midday.

References

External links
 Mount Saint Mary website
 

Hills of Slovenia
Geography of Ljubljana
Šmarna Gora District